The Canadian cricket team toured the Netherlands in 2009. They played two One Day Internationals and an Intercontinental Cup match against the Netherlands.

Intercontinental Cup match

ODI series

1st ODI

2nd ODI

2009 in cricket
2009 in Dutch sport
International cricket competitions in 2009
Canadian cricket tours abroad
International cricket tours of the Netherlands
Canada–Netherlands relations